Switzerland participated at the Eurovision Song Contest 2010 with the song "Il pleut de l'or" written by Michael von der Heide, Pele Loriano and Heike Kospach. The song was performed by Michael von der Heide, who was internally selected by the Swiss broadcaster SRG SSR idée suisse to represent the nation at the 2010 contest in Oslo, Norway. "Il pleut de l'or" was announced as the Swiss entry on 18 December 2009, while the song was presented to the public on 9 January 2010.

Switzerland was drawn to compete in the second semi-final of the Eurovision Song Contest which took place on 27 May 2010. Performing during the show in position 5, "Il pleut de l'or" was not announced among the top 10 entries of the second semi-final and therefore did not qualify to compete in the final. It was later revealed that Switzerland placed seventeenth (last) out of the 17 participating countries in the semi-final with 2 points.

Background 

Prior to the 2010 contest, Switzerland had participated in the Eurovision Song Contest fifty times since its first entry in 1956. Switzerland is noted for having won the first edition of the Eurovision Song Contest with the song "Refrain" performed by Lys Assia. Their second and, to this point, most recent victory was achieved in 1988 when Canadian singer Céline Dion won the contest with the song "Ne partez pas sans moi". In 2005, the internal selection of Estonian girl band Vanilla Ninja, performing the song "Cool Vibes", qualified Switzerland to the final where they placed 8th. Due to their successful result in 2005, Switzerland was pre-qualified to compete directly in the final in 2006. Since 2007, the nation failed to qualify to the final with a string of internal selections. In 2009, Lovebugs and their song "The Highest Heights" failed to qualify Switzerland to the final placing 14th in their semi-final.

The Swiss national broadcaster, SRG SSR idée suisse, broadcasts the event within Switzerland and organises the selection process for the nation's entry. SRG SSR idée suisse confirmed their intentions to participate at the 2010 Eurovision Song Contest on 3 July 2009. Along with their participation confirmation, the broadcaster also announced that the Swiss entry for the 2010 contest would be selected internally. Switzerland has selected their entry for the Eurovision Song Contest through both national finals and internal selections in the past. Since 2005, the Swiss entry was internally selected for the competition.

Before Eurovision

Internal selection

SRG SSR idée suisse opened a submission period between 3 July 2009 and 22 October 2009 for interested artists and composers to submit their entries. Eligible artists were those that have had television and stage experience (live performances), have made at least one video and have released at least one CD which placed among the top 50 in an official chart. In addition to the public submission, the broadcaster was also in contact with individual composers and lyricists as well as the music industry to be involved in the selection process. On 18 December 2009, "Il pleut de l'or" performed by Michael von der Heide was announced as the Swiss entry for the Eurovision Song Contest 2010. Michael von der Heide had previously attempted to represent Germany at the Eurovision Song Contest in 1999, placing fifth in the national final Countdown Grand Prix 1999 with the song "Bye Bye Bar". Both the artist and song were selected from over 60 entry submissions by a jury panel consisting of representatives of the three broadcasters in Switzerland: the Swiss-German broadcaster Schweizer Fernsehen (SF), the Swiss-French broadcaster Télévision Suisse Romande (TSR) and the Swiss-Italian broadcaster Radiotelevisione svizzera (RSI). 

"Il pleut de l'or", which was written by Michael von der Heide together with Pele Loriano and Heike Kospach, was presented to the public on 9 January 2010 during the annual SwissAward show broadcast on SF1, TSR 2 and RSI La 2. The official music video of the song was released on 14 March 2010. English and German language versions of the song, respectively titled "It's Raining Gold" and "Es regnet Gold", were also released afterwards.

Promotion
Michael von der Heide made several appearances across Europe to specifically promote "Il pleut de l'or" as the Swiss Eurovision entry. On 27 February, Von der Heide performed a new version of "Il pleut de l'or" during the Latvian Eurovision national final Eirodziesma 2010. On 24 March, Von der Heide performed during the Eurovision in Concert event which was held at the Lexion venue in Zaanstad, Netherlands and hosted by Cornald Maas and Marga Bult.

At Eurovision

According to Eurovision rules, all nations with the exceptions of the host country and the "Big Four" (France, Germany, Spain and the United Kingdom) were required to qualify from one of two semi-finals in order to compete for the final; the top ten countries from each semi-final progress to the final. The European Broadcasting Union (EBU) split up the competing countries into six different pots based on voting patterns from previous contests, with countries with favourable voting histories put into the same pot. On 7 February 2010, a special allocation draw was held which placed each country into one of the two semi-finals, as well as which half of the show they would perform in. Switzerland was placed into the second semi-final, to be held on 27 May 2010, and was scheduled to perform in the first half of the show. The running order for the semi-finals was decided through another draw on 23 March 2010 and as one of the five wildcard countries, Switzerland chose to perform in position 5, following the entry from Denmark and before the entry from Sweden.

In Switzerland, three broadcasters that form SRG SSR idée suisse aired the contest. Sven Epiney provided German commentary for both semi-finals and the final airing on SF zwei. Jean-Marc Richard and Nicolas Tanner provided French commentary on TSR 2 for the second semi-final and the final. Sandy Altermatt provided Italian commentary for the second semi-final and the final on RSI La 1. The Swiss spokesperson, who announced the Swiss votes during the final, was Christa Rigozzi.

Semi-final

Michael von der Heide took part in technical rehearsals on 18 and 21 May, followed by dress rehearsals on 26 and 27 May. This included the jury show on 26 May where the professional juries of each country watched and voted on the competing entries.

The Swiss performance featured Michael von der Heide performing on stage in a gold suit together with three female backing vocalists in pink, yellow and grey dresses and an additional male backing vocalist who also played the balalaika. Von der Heide and the female backing vocalists also wore long stripes of cloth attached to their hands. Silver balls and illuminated strips of light were used for parts of the stage and the performance featured several effects including pyrotechnics and flames. The three female backing vocalists that joined Michael von der Heide were: Amanda Nikolić, Freda Goodlett and Sybille Fässler, while the male backing performer was the co-composer of "Il pleut de l'or" Pele Loriano.

At the end of the show, Switzerland was not announced among the top 10 entries in the second semi-final and therefore failed to qualify to compete in the final. It was later revealed that Switzerland placed seventeenth (last) in the semi-final, receiving a total of 2 points.

Voting 
Voting during the three shows consisted of 50 percent public televoting and 50 percent from a jury deliberation. The jury consisted of five music industry professionals who were citizens of the country they represent. This jury was asked to judge each contestant based on: vocal capacity; the stage performance; the song's composition and originality; and the overall impression by the act. In addition, no member of a national jury could be related in any way to any of the competing acts in such a way that they cannot vote impartially and independently.

Following the release of the full split voting by the EBU after the conclusion of the competition, it was revealed that Switzerland had placed seventeenth (last) with the public televote and sixteenth with the jury vote in the second semi-final. In the public vote, Switzerland scored 1 point, while with the jury vote, Switzerland scored 14 points.

Below is a breakdown of points awarded to Switzerland and awarded by Switzerland in the first semi-final and grand final of the contest. The nation awarded its 12 points to Albania in the semi-final and to Albania in the final of the contest.

Points awarded to Switzerland

Points awarded by Switzerland

After Eurovision
After failing to qualify, von der Heide joked that he would go again for Switzerland with a duet with Swedish singer and former Eurovision winner Carola.

Several Eurovision songs charted in the Swiss Music Charts. The winning song, Lena's "Satellite" for Germany, reached number one, having previously peaked at number 2 in April 2010. "Satellite" is the first Eurovision winning song to reach the top of the Swiss charts since 1982, with Nicole's "Ein bißchen Frieden", also for Germany.

Entries from Denmark, Azerbaijan, Belgium, Romania, Armenia, Turkey, Sweden, Iceland, Ukraine and the Swiss entry itself also charted. "Il pleut de l'or", which charted at #65, was Michael von der Heide's first ever song to chart on the Swiss singles chart after 12 years in the music business.

References

External links
  Rules for 2010 selection SRG SSR idée suisse

2010
Countries in the Eurovision Song Contest 2010
Eurovision